Edward "Eddie" Byrne (29 October 1905 – 29 October 1944) was an Irish hurler who played as a midfielder for the Dublin and Kilkenny senior teams.

Byrne made his first appearance for the Dublin team during the 1929 championship and became a regular player on the inter-county scene over the next decade. During that time he won three All-Ireland medals, five Leinster medals and two National Hurling League medal.

Byrne enjoyed a lengthy club career with Dicksboro and Young Irelands.

His brother, Podge Byrne, also played hurling with Kilkenny.

References

1905 births
1944 deaths
Dicksboro hurlers
Young Irelands (Dublin) hurlers
Kilkenny inter-county hurlers
Dublin inter-county hurlers
All-Ireland Senior Hurling Championship winners